Matthew John Clarke (7 March 1863, Downpatrick – 13 April 1923, Launceston, Tasmania) was an Australian politician. Between 20 January 1897 and 9 March 1900 he was one of the 4 members for Launceston at the Tasmanian House of Assembly. He was educated at the Royal University of Ireland and the University of Tasmania.

References

Members of the Tasmanian House of Assembly
1863 births
1923 deaths
19th-century Australian politicians